Penwith was a non-metropolitan district in Cornwall, England. It was abolished on 1 April 2009 and replaced by Cornwall Council.

Political control
The first election to the council was held in 1973, initially operating as a shadow authority before coming into its powers on 1 April 1974. Political control of the council from 1973 until the council's abolition in 2009 was held by the following parties:

Council elections
1973 Penwith District Council election
1976 Penwith District Council election
1979 Penwith District Council election (New ward boundaries)
1980 Penwith District Council election
1982 Penwith District Council election
1983 Penwith District Council election
1984 Penwith District Council election
1986 Penwith District Council election
1987 Penwith District Council election
1988 Penwith District Council election
1990 Penwith District Council election
1991 Penwith District Council election
1992 Penwith District Council election
1994 Penwith District Council election
1995 Penwith District Council election
1996 Penwith District Council election
1998 Penwith District Council election
1999 Penwith District Council election
2000 Penwith District Council election
2002 Penwith District Council election
2003 Penwith District Council election
2004 Penwith District Council election (New ward boundaries)
2006 Penwith District Council election
2007 Penwith District Council election

By-election results

References

External links
Penwith Council

 
Penwith
Council elections in Cornwall
District council elections in England